William Garfit (9 November 1840 – 29 October 1920) was an English banker and Conservative Party politician from the town of Boston in Lincolnshire. He held several local offices in Lincolnshire, and sat in the House of Commons from 1895 to 1906.

Early life 
He was the eldest son of William Garfit from Boston and his wife Jane, the daughter of J. Hassard Short of Horncastle. He was educated at Harrow and at Trinity College, Cambridge, where he graduated with a B.A. degree in 1862.

Career 
Garfit became a banker, rising to the post of director of the Capital and Counties Bank by 1895,  vice-chairman in 1899 and chairman by 1916.

He was appointed as a Deputy Lieutenant of Lincolnshire in 1891, was High Sheriff of Lincolnshire in 1892, and was also a Justice of the Peace (J.P) in Lincolnshire. He served as a captain in the 2nd Lincoln Rifle Volunteers from 1874 to 1881.

He was elected as a Member of Parliament (MP) for the borough of Boston at the 1895 general election, defeating the sitting Liberal Party MP  Sir William James Ingram, Bt. He was re-elected in 1900, but was defeated at the 1906 general election by the Liberal George Henry Faber.

In July 1911 he was appointed as a member of the new advisory committee on the selection of Justices in the Parts of Holland.

Personal life 
In 1868 Garfit married Mary Krause, the daughter of Connolly Norman from Derry.

They lived at Chesham Place in London, and West Skirbeck House in Boston, Lincolnshire, England.

References

External links 
 

1840 births
1920 deaths
Conservative Party (UK) MPs for English constituencies
UK MPs 1895–1900
UK MPs 1900–1906
High Sheriffs of Lincolnshire
Deputy Lieutenants of Lincolnshire
People from Boston, Lincolnshire
People educated at Harrow School
Alumni of Trinity College, Cambridge
English bankers